John Macleod (sometimes spelled McLeod) is a Canadian-born English songwriter and musician.

Career
Macleod moved to Britain in the 1940s, and lived in the Halifax area with his wife before moving to Brighton.  In the 1950s, he was a member of the vocal group the Maple Leaf Four, with his brother, baritone Norman, Alan Harvey as tenor and Joe Melia (stagename Joe Ross) as second tenor. The group made regular appearances on British TV, and released at least two albums, Home on the Range and Old Familiar Favourites.

By the early 1960s, Macleod worked on writing advertising jingles. In the 1960s and early 1970s, Macleod co-wrote songs with Tony Macaulay. They had major success with The Foundations, when they recorded "Baby Now That I've Found You", and it topped the UK Singles Chart in November 1967. 

This was followed by Long John Baldry's "Let the Heartaches Begin", Paper Dolls' "Something Here in My Heart (Keeps A Tellin' Me No)" and Pickettywitch's "That Same Old Feeling".

The full list of songs that Macleod wrote with Macaulay are:

In the early 1970s, Macleod presented a series of easy listening instrumental albums comprising cover versions of chart hits, on the Pye label. In 1975 he worked again with his brother Norman, and brother-in-law actor Bill Pertwee, on the music for the Dad's Army stage show, producing an EMI single "Get Out And Get Under The Moon", and writing the B-side number "Hooligans!" – after Bill Pertwee's character Warden Hodge's catch phrase.

Discography
 John Macleod Presents Hits Philharmonic – The London Pops Orchestra (Pye, 1970)
 John Macleod Presents Hits Philharmonic Vol.2 – The London Pops Orchestra (Pye, 1970)
 John Macleod Presents Hits Philharmonic Vol.3 – The London Pops Orchestra (Pye, 1971)
 John Macleod Presents A String Bag of Bones (Pye, 1971)

References

External links
Discogs.com

Canadian expatriates in England
Year of birth missing (living people)
Living people
English songwriters
English record producers
English composers